Javier Andrés Parraguez Herrera (born 31 December 1989) is a Chilean footballer who plays as a striker for Coquimbo Unido.

Career
After a stint with Brazilian club Sport Recife in 2022 loaned by Colo-Colo, he returned to his homeland and signed with Coquimbo Unido for the 2023 season.

References

External links
 
 Javier Parraguez at playmakerstats.com (English version of ceroacero.es)

1989 births
Living people
Footballers from Santiago
Chilean footballers
Chilean expatriate footballers
Association football forwards
Deportes Linares footballers
Deportes Melipilla footballers
Everton de Viña del Mar footballers
Deportes Magallanes footballers
Magallanes footballers
Puerto Montt footballers
C.D. Huachipato footballers
Santiago Wanderers footballers
Colo-Colo footballers
Sport Club do Recife players
Coquimbo Unido footballers
Tercera División de Chile players
Primera B de Chile players
Segunda División Profesional de Chile players
Chilean Primera División players
Campeonato Brasileiro Série B players
Chilean expatriate sportspeople in Brazil
Expatriate footballers in Brazil